George Woodruff may refer to:

 George Catlin Woodruff (1805–1885), American politician, U.S. Representative from Connecticut
 George Cecil Woodruff (1888–1968), American businessman and football coach
 George Washington Woodruff (1864–1934), American football coach
 Bob Woodruff (American football) (George Robert Woodruff, 1916–2001), American football coach
 George W. Woodruff (1895–1987), American businessman and philanthropist